Massimo Minervin (born 30 March 1939) is an Italian former sailor who competed in the 1964 Summer Olympics.

References

1939 births
Living people
Olympic sailors of Italy
Italian male sailors (sport)
Sailors at the 1964 Summer Olympics – 5.5 Metre
Place of birth missing (living people)